Thérèse Maria Adloff ( Chaudron; 10 November 1904, in Badonviller, Meurthe-et-Moselle – 4 December 2005, in Oberhausbergen, Bas-Rhin) was a member of the French Resistance in World War II who helped people evade the Nazis.

Biography 

A worker in the Badon faience factory, aged 18, she married Alphonse Adloff on 16 December 1922, and became manager of the Badon brasserie via her husband, who already held that job.

World War I have made a lasting impression, she joined the Resistance and, from the beginning of German occupation, provided shelter and support for hundreds of people evading the concentration camps. She provided false documentation and clothes and sent them on the "evasion route" of Donon and Grande-Fontaine, saving hundreds of lives.

She was arrested in August 1942 and went to several concentration camps like Mauthausen and Ravensbrück.

Awards 
 Officier of the Legion of Honour
 Médaille militaire
 Médaille de la résistance
 Croix de guerre 1939–1945 with palms

References 

1904 births
2005 deaths
Mauthausen concentration camp survivors
Ravensbrück concentration camp survivors
Officiers of the Légion d'honneur
Female resistance members of World War II
French centenarians
Women centenarians
People from Meurthe-et-Moselle